Sar Tang ol Majan (also known as Sar Tang) is a village in Tayebi-ye Sarhadi-ye Gharbi Rural District, Charusa District, Kohgiluyeh County, Kohgiluyeh and Boyer-Ahmad Province, Iran. At the 2006 census, its population was 27, in 6 families.

References 

Populated places in Kohgiluyeh County